Pál Csáky (born 21 March 1956) is a Slovak politician, a member of Hungarian minority in Slovakia and the country's former Deputy Prime Minister for European affairs, human rights and minorities. Csáky was an activist for the Hungarian minority in Czechoslovakia since 1977. His political activity started in 1989, and since 1990 he has been a member of National Council (Slovakia's parliament). The Party of the Hungarian Coalition was named a member of the governing coalition in 1998, and Csáky became a member of several advisory bodies and ministerial councils.

On March 31, 2007, Csáky was elected president of the Party of the Hungarian Coalition. In 2010, he was succeeded by József Berényi. He is married and has four daughters. He was elected as a Member of the European Parliament in the 2014 European Parliament election.

References

External links 
 (page about current minister, archived version about Pál Csáky *)
 

1956 births
Living people
People from Šahy
Hungarians in Slovakia
Party of the Hungarian Community MEPs
MEPs for Slovakia 2014–2019
Members of the National Council (Slovakia) 1992-1994
Members of the National Council (Slovakia) 1994-1998
Members of the National Council (Slovakia) 2006-2010